Estonia competed at the Winter Olympic Games for the first time at the 1928 Winter Olympics in St. Moritz, Switzerland.

Estonia sent 2 athletes and 2 representatives to those games. Representatives were Eduard Hiiop and Johannes Villemson, however none attained a top-three spot.

Speed skating

Men

References

 Olympic Winter Games 1928, full results by sports-reference.com

External links
 EOK – Amsterdam 1928 

Nations at the 1928 Winter Olympics
1928
Olympics, Winter